Homaloptera is a genus of ray-finned fish in the family Balitoridae.

Species
There are currently 6 recognized species in this genus:
 Homaloptera bilineata Blyth, 1860
 Homaloptera confuzona Kottelat, 2000
 Homaloptera ocellata van der Hoeven, 1833
 Homaloptera ogilviei Alfred, 1967
 Homaloptera orthogoniata Vaillant, 1902
 Homaloptera parclitella H. H. Tan & P. K. L. Ng, 2005

References

 
Balitoridae
Taxa named by Johan Conrad van Hasselt